Palace of Gold may refer to:

 Palace of Gold (album) by Canadian country rock band Blue Rodeo.
 Prabhupada's Palace of Gold near Moundsville, West Virginia.

See also
 Golden Palace (disambiguation)